Edwin J. Hess (born November 9, 1933) is an American businessman, Senior Vice President, and Management Committee Member at Exxon from 1993 to 1998. He had previously been the Vice President of Environment and Safety since 1990 and joined the company in 1957.

While at Exxon, the board appointed Hess, a veteran executive, as the first corporate vice president for environment and safety, the first time it elevated environmental concerns to the senior executive level. The new position, created in the wake of Exxon's oil spill in the Arthur Kill off Staten Island, allowed Hess to supervise environmental and safety activities all across the corporation. Until Hess's appointment, environmental and safety issues had been dealt with at lower levels. Hess reported directly to Exxon's president, Lee R. Raymond.

Early life and education 
Edwin Hess was born in Newark, New Jersey on November 9, 1933. Hess received a bachelor's degree in mechanical engineering from Stevens Institute of Technology in 1955 where he was class president and top of his class. Hess went on to earn his master's degree in business administration from Harvard University in 1957. He was awarded the Alumni Achievement award from Stevens Institute of technology in 1980, Stevens Honor Award for 1993, and the Stevens Renaissance Engineering and Science Award for 1996.

Career 
Hess began working for Exxon in 1957. Upon his Harvard graduation, Hess joined the Exxon-predecessor's policy-level management development system placing him on the corporate fast-track system. Hess joined Exxon Company, USA in 1957, at the companies Bayway Refinery in Linden, New Jersey. Hess moved to Houston in 1961 in various capacities in the marketing, refining, supply and production areas of the oil business. In 1974, he became deputy manager of the corporation's public affairs department in New York City. He returned to Houston in 1978, as vice president of marketing for Exxon Company, USA and in 1981, he was named as senior vice president. Ed Hess was appointed executive vice president of the corporation's worldwide supply in transportation organization in 1985. He was the leader named senior vice president of marketing, refining and planning for Exxon Company, International, which coordinates the corporations oil and gas operations outside of the United States. In January 1990, Hess became Vice President of Environment and Safety for Exxon Corporation and was responsible for developing, reviewing and coordinating corporations worldwide environmental and safety plans. He was the first to hold his newly created position. In 1993, Ed Hess went on to occupy the position of Senior Vice President while serving on Exxon's Management Committee placing him as the second in command for the Exxon Corporation. The board elected Hess as senior V.P. of Exxon corporate, and a member of its five-person management committee comprising the CEO/board chairman and four senior V.P.s. That committee acting as a team, convened several times each week orchestrating at policy level the people, resources, processes, and performance of the world-wide $438 billion business. Hess was appointed the responsibility of leading the move and construction of Exxon's New York headquarters to Irving, Texas.

Hess says his proudest accomplishment at Exxon was while serving as Vice President of Environment and Safety, developing Exxon's Operations Integrity Management System (OIMS), which is still criticality used at ExxonMobil today. 

Ed Hess was chairman of the board of directors of the National Action Council for Minorities in Engineering (NACME), served on the Harvard Business School's Executive Council, a member of the American Petroleum Institute, the board of trustees of Stevens Institute of Technology, the Stevens Institute Edwin A. Stevens Society Committee, the board of trustees of The Science Place, the board of trustees and executive committee of the United States Counsel for International Business, and the board of directors of Junior Achievement of Dallas, Inc.

Awards and honors 

 1980 Alumni Achievement Award from Stevens Institute of Technology
 1993 Stevens Honor Award
 1996 The Stevens Renaissance Engineering and Science Award for 1996
 2007 Stevens Institute of Technology Hall of Achievement Award for sustained and meritorious contributions in mechanical engineering

References 

1933 births
Living people
ExxonMobil people
Stevens Institute of Technology alumni
American energy industry executives
Businesspeople from Newark, New Jersey
Harvard Business School alumni
21st-century American businesspeople
20th-century American businesspeople